Cottonwood is a former community in Elko County, Nevada, United States.

References

External links
Cottonwood, Nevada. Landmarkhunter.com.

Geography of Elko County, Nevada
Ghost towns in Nevada